Fujairah F2 Independent Water and Power Plant or Fujairah F2 IWPP is an independent water and power plant (IWPP) at Qidfa', Fujairah in the United Arab Emirates. It is located next to the Fujairah F1 IWPP plant south of Khor Fakkan and north of the city of Fujairah. During inauguration, it was the largest desalination plant in the United Arab Emirates.

History
Abu Dhabi Water & Electricity Authority (ADWEA) selected International Power and Marubeni Corporation to build the project in 2007. The plant costed $2.8 billion to build and took three years to be completely finished.

Technical description
The Fujairah F2 IWPP has an installed power capacity of 2,000 MW and it produces 591,500 cubic meter of water per day. GT26 heavy-duty gas turbines to the power plant will be distributed by Alstom, while the desalination plant will be built by Sidem.

For the water desalination, the plant uses a combination of two different desalination technologies. 455,000 cubic meter of water per day is produced using multiple-effect distillation (MED) technology and 136,500 cubic meter of water per day is produced using reverse osmosis technology (RO).

Operating company
The plant is owned by the Fujairah Asia Power Company (FAPCO), established on 23 October 2007. The shareholders of FAPCO are:

The Abu Dhabi Water and Electricity Authority (ADWEA) – 60%
International Power – 20%
Marubeni – 20%

The plant will be operated by Fujairah F2 O&M Company Limited, an equal based venture between International Power and Marubeni. The Reverse Osmosis plant will be operated by Veolia Water.

References

2007 establishments in the United Arab Emirates
Natural gas-fired power stations in the United Arab Emirates
Integrated water and power plants
Buildings and structures in the Emirate of Fujairah
Economy of the Emirate of Fujairah
Water supply and sanitation in the United Arab Emirates